Messiah Marcolin (born Bror Jan Alfredo Marcolin; 10 December 1967), also known as Eddie Marcolin, is a Swedish singer best known for his work in the epic doom metal band Candlemass. He is well known for his operatic voice and for his signature "Doom Dance", an exaggerated stomping motion.

Biography

1984–1985 
Marcolin's first releases were with the heavy metal band Mercy. After recording an EP, Mercy were looking for a singer to record with and Messiah was asked to join just two weeks before recording. He sang on two Mercy albums, the first a self-titled debut in 1984, and Witchburner a year later. The albums were influenced by Black Sabbath while the falsetto shrieks were influenced by Mercyful Fate singer King Diamond. Looking for a heavier direction, Messiah decided to leave the band.

1987–1991: Early career with Candlemass 
Marcolin initially joined Candlemass to replace session vocalist Johan Längqvist, who could not be convinced to remain as singer for the band after Epicus Doomicus Metallicus. The band got Marcolin's name from Tom Hallbäck, a refrigerator salesman from Helsingborg and the drummer for thrash bands God BC and Hysteriah GBC. His debut with Candlemass is the band's second album, Nightfall. He sang on two subsequent albums, Ancient Dreams and Tales of Creation and performed on a live album.  Due to personal differences with some of the other members during the Tales of Creation tour in 1991, Marcolin left Candlemass.

1991–2001 
Messiah worked on several projects after departing Candlemass. In 1993, he co-founded Memento Mori with Mike Wead and sang on two of their albums in 1993 and 1994 before leaving as he was not being credited for writing melodies. Messiah then worked with members of Stillborn on a project named "Colossus" and released a demo and contributed a cover of "Sad But True" to a Metallica tribute album titled Metal Militia: A Tribute to Metallica II in 1996. The band was inactive after this recording and Messiah returned to Memento Mori to record and release Songs for the Apocalypse, Vol. 4 in 1997.  He also performed guest vocals for the melodic death metal/blackened death metal band Satariel.

2002–2006 

The "Nightfall era" lineup of Candlemass reformed in 2002 and did various festivals and gigs. Candlemass released recordings from its live activity during this period as Doomed For Live and released a compilation, Essential Doom, which included a demo version of "Witches", a song that would later be included on Candlemass' self-titled 2005 album.  After releasing Candlemass, Messiah appeared on two DVD releases: Documents of Doom and The Curse of Candlemass. Candlemass announced in October 2006 that Messiah had departed from the band once again.

Additionally, in 2003, Messiah co-founded Requiem and released a three-song demo, although the band dissolved due to Candlemass' reunion and musical differences within the band.

2007–present 
Messiah was a guest vocalist with Therion for a string of live performances in 2007. In 2011, Messiah appeared live with Swedish heavy metal band Portrait, covering the Mercyful Fate song "Black Funeral". In 2013, he sang on "Hel", a song on Amon Amarth's Deceiver of the Gods.

References

External links 
Encyclopaedia Metallum: the Metal Archives
http://metal-rules.com/interviews/candlemass.htm
 Requiem official page
Myspace page

1967 births
Living people
Swedish heavy metal singers
Swedish male singers
Therion (band) members
Candlemass (band) members
Memento Mori (band) members